Gökalp Kılıç (born 21 January 2000) is a German professional footballer who plays as a midfielder for FV Illertissen.

Career
In May 2018, Kılıç signed his first professional contract with 1. FC Heidenheim, lasting three years until 30 June 2021. He made his professional debut for Heidenheim in the 2. Bundesliga on 8 March 2019, coming on as a substitute in the 59th minute for Tim Skarke in the match against VfL Bochum, which finished as a 0–1 away loss.

References

External links
 Profile at DFB.de
 Profile at kicker.de

2000 births
Living people
German footballers
Association football midfielders
1. FC Heidenheim players
SSV Ulm 1846 players
FC Memmingen players
FV Illertissen players
2. Bundesliga players
Regionalliga players